van der Gaag is a Dutch surname. Notable people with the surname include:

Anna van der Gaag, British speech and language therapist and academic
Lotti van der Gaag (1923–1999), Dutch sculptor and painter
Wim van der Gaag (born 1936), Dutch footballer and coach
Mitchell van der Gaag (born 1971), Dutch footballer and coach, son of Wim
Jordan van der Gaag (born 1999), Dutch footballer, son of Mitchell
Lucas van der Gaag (born 2001), Dutch footballer, son of Mitchell

See also
Van der Gaag Lane, road in Delft, Netherlands

Dutch-language surnames
Surnames of Dutch origin